The Saint Paul's Church also known as Saint Paul's Protestant Episcopal Church, is a historic Episcopal church in Petersburg, Virginia, United States.  It was designed by Niernsee & Neilson and built between 1855 and 1857, in the Gothic Revival style. The church is constructed of brick and features a three-story entrance tower. Also on the property are a contributing rectory (c. 1860) and parish house (1922).  The church was attended by Robert E. Lee during the Siege of Petersburg in 1864–65.

It was listed on the National Register of Historic Places in 1986.  It is located in the Petersburg Courthouse Historic District.

References

19th-century Episcopal church buildings
Buildings and structures in Petersburg, Virginia
Churches completed in 1857
Episcopal churches in Virginia
Gothic Revival church buildings in Virginia
Individually listed contributing properties to historic districts on the National Register in Virginia
National Register of Historic Places in Petersburg, Virginia
Churches on the National Register of Historic Places in Virginia
1857 establishments in Virginia